Shandon is a closed railway station located at Shandon on the east shore of Gare Loch, in Argyll and Bute. It is located towards the southern end of the West Highland Railway.

History 
This station opened to passengers on 7 August 1894.

The station was laid out with a crossing loop around an island platform. There was a siding with a loading bank on the east side of the station. The station was host to a LNER camping coach from 1936 to 1939.

The station closed on 15 June 1964.

There have been proposals to reopen the station as part of an experiment to open ‘pop-up’ stations in Scotland.

Signalling 
From the time of its opening in 1894, the West Highland Railway was worked throughout by the electric token system. Shandon signal box, which had 15 levers, was situated at the south end of the island platform.

The signal box and crossing loop were taken out of use on 2 April 1967. The single line was subsequently realigned through the site of the island platform. As a result, very little trace can be seen of this station today, although the loading bank remains.

See also
Faslane Platform railway station - A nearby temporary WWII station

References

Notes

Sources

Further reading 
 
 
 Shandon station on navigable OS map

Disused railway stations in Argyll and Bute
Railway stations in Great Britain opened in 1894
Railway stations in Great Britain closed in 1964
Beeching closures in Scotland
Former North British Railway stations
James Miller railway stations